The 1949–50 Iraq FA Basra League was the second season of the Iraq FA Basra League (the top division of football in Basra from 1948 to 1973) organised by the Basra branch of the Iraq Football Association. The tournament began on 19 October 1949, and the regular season ended in November 1949 with Sharikat Naft Al-Basra and Al-Ittihad qualifying for the final. Sharikat Naft Al-Basra beat Al-Ittihad 5–1 in January 1950 to win the title for the first time.

Regular season

Results

Final

References

External links
 Iraqi Football Website

Iraq FA Basra League seasons
Iraq
1949 in Iraqi sport
1950 in Iraqi sport